Ifeanyi Udeze (born 21 July 1980) is a former Nigerian professional footballer who played as a defender. He now works with Brila FM, one of the biggest sports radio in Nigeria as a Sports analyst. He participated in the 2002 World Cup, and played mainly as a left-back, he is also used as centre-back.

Club career
Udeze played for clubs such as Bendel Insurance FC, AO Kavalas (Greece) and PAOK Thessaloniki, before joining West Bromwich Albion in 2003. In his first season with the Albion, he played in the Premier League, joining the club on loan in the latter stages of the season after which Albion were relegated.

He was released from AEK Athens in January 2007, six months after signing a three-year contract on 11 August 2006.

On 4 July 2007, he returned to PAOK FC, signing a two-year deal. A niggling knee injury prevented him from grabbing a first team spot and he was released after a year at the club.

International career

Udeze first came into international limelight at the inaugural UEFA-CAF Meridian Cup held in Portugal in 1997, a tournament where Spain's Xavi and Portugal's Simao made their mark. He was a member of the Fanny Amun-led Nigerian squad that beat Spain 3–2 to win the tournament. Some members of the squad included Rabiu Afolabi, Joseph Enakarhire, Bright Igbinadolor, Chijioke Nwankpa, Hashimu Garba, and Mohammed Aliyu Datti.

Having made his full international debut in 2001, Udeze went on to feature for Nigeria at the 2002 African Cup of Nations and 2004, and the 2002 World Cup, playing two games.

At the 2002 African Cup of Nations held in Mali, he was selected among the CAF Team of the Tournament.

During his playing days, he was Super Eagles' second choice left-back to former Chelsea left-back, Celestine Babayaro. On some occasions, he played together with Babayaro; both switching positions from the left full-back to the left wing of the midfield, often confusing opponents with their identical style of play.

Udeze was noted for his feistiness, intelligent marking and remarkable recovery rate. He was Nigeria's most fouled defender in games he featured in. Whenever he joined the attack, he was seldom dispossessed of the ball without winning a free-kick, corner or throw-in.

Udeze last featured for Nigeria in a 2006 World Cup qualifier against Angola in 2005.

References

External links

1980 births
Living people
Sportspeople from Lagos
Nigerian footballers
Association football fullbacks
Nigeria international footballers
2002 FIFA World Cup players
2002 African Cup of Nations players
2004 African Cup of Nations players
Premier League players
Super League Greece players
Bendel Insurance F.C. players
PAOK FC players
Kavala F.C. players
West Bromwich Albion F.C. players
AEK Athens F.C. players
Nigerian expatriate footballers
Nigerian expatriate sportspeople in Greece
Expatriate footballers in Greece
Nigerian expatriate sportspeople in England
Expatriate footballers in England